Jan Andersson is a retired Swedish footballer. Andersson. Andersson made 38 Allsvenskan appearances for Djurgården and scored 4 goals.

References

Swedish footballers
Djurgårdens IF Fotboll players
1965 births
Living people
Association footballers not categorized by position